Robecchetto con Induno (Milanese: , locally ) is a comune (municipality) in the Metropolitan City of Milan in the Italian region Lombardy, located about  west of Milan. 

Robecchetto con Induno borders the following municipalities: Castano Primo, Turbigo, Cuggiono, Galliate.

See also
Georges Ernest Boulanger

References

External links

 
 Circolo Scacchistico Cavalli&Segugi

Cities and towns in Lombardy